Erasure are an English synth-pop duo that have released 19 studio albums, six live albums, nine compilation albums, seven box sets, 14 extended plays, 62 singles, 14 video albums and 50 music videos. Erasure consists of keyboardist Vince Clarke and singer Andy Bell.

Erasure made their debut in 1985. Their third studio album, The Innocents (1988), reached number one on the UK Albums Chart, becoming the first of four consecutive albums to reach the top position. From 1986 to 2007, the duo achieved 32 consecutive top-40 singles on the UK Singles Chart, while attaining three top-20 singles on the US Billboard Hot 100: "A Little Respect", "Chains of Love", and "Always". By 2009, 34 of their 45 singles and EPs (of which eight out of the 45 were not eligible to chart in the UK) had made the UK top 40, with 17 climbing into the top 10.

Albums

Studio albums

Compilation albums

Live albums

Box sets

Erasure Information Service releases

Extended plays

Singles

1985–1999

2000–present

Video

Video albums

Music videos

Other appearances 
Below is a list of songs recorded by Erasure which are not available on Erasure LPs.

Notes

References

Discography
Discographies of British artists
Pop music group discographies